The 2007-08 FFHG Division 1 season was contested by 14 teams, and saw the Bisons de Neuilly-sur-Marne win the championship. They were promoted to the Ligue Magnus as result. The Anges du Vésinet were relegated to FFHG Division 2.

Regular season

Playoffs

Semifinals
 Vipers de Montpellier - Bisons de Neuilly-sur-Marne 5:4/5:8 
 Boxers de Bordeaux - Rapaces de Gap 3:4/3:6

Finals
 Bisons de Neuilly-sur-Marne - Rapaces de Gap 4:2/4:5

External links
Season on hockeyarchives.info

FFHG Division 1 seasons
2007–08 in French ice hockey
Fra